Michael of Kiev may refer to:

 Mikhail of Vladimir, first grand prince of Kiev named Michael, reigned briefly in 1171
 Michael of Chernigov, 2nd grand prince of Kiev named Michael, reigned 1238–1239 & anew 1241–1246, executed by Mongols, glorified as a Saint
Michael of Kiev (metropolitan), First Metropolitan of Kiev (died 992)